The Invisible Man (later known as H.G. Wells' Invisible Man) is a British black-and-white science fiction television series that aired on ITV from September 1958 to July 1959. It was aired on CBS in the United States, running two seasons and totalling 26 half-hour episodes. The series was nominally based on the 1897 novel by H. G. Wells, one of four such television series. In this version, the deviation from the novel went as far as changing the main character's name from Dr. Griffin to Dr. Peter Brady who remained a sane man, not a power-hungry lunatic as in the book or the 1933 film adaptation. None of the other characters from the novel appeared in the series.

Plot
The series follows the adventures of Dr. Peter Brady, a scientist who is attempting to achieve invisibility with light refraction. However, the experiment goes wrong and turns him permanently invisible. He is initially declared a state secret and locked up, but eventually convinces the UK government, represented by Sir Charles Anderson, to allow him to return to his laboratory and search for an antidote ("Secret Experiment"). Almost immediately, British Intelligence recruits him for an assignment ("Crisis in the Desert"), but soon security is breached ("Behind the Mask") and he becomes a celebrity ("Picnic with Death"), consequently also using his invisibility to help people in trouble, as well as solve crimes and defeat spies for his country.

Cast
 The Invisible Man — Himself* (series voice: Tim Turner, uncredited; unaired pilot episode voice: Robert Beatty, uncredited)
 Lisa Daniely as Jane Brady Wilson (unaired pilot episode) / Diane Brady Wilson (series) (Brady's widowed sister)**
 Deborah Watling as Sally Wilson (Diane's daughter)
 Ernest Clark as Sir Charles Anderson (series 1 only) / Colonel Ward (series 2 only)

* This is how the character is credited on the rear sleeve of the Network DVD release. Billed in on-screen closing credits as simply The Invisible Man, with no actor's name listed. Michael Goodliffe, who plays the criminal scientist Crompton in the first story, is credited in the original release promotional documentation.
** In the unaired pilot episode The Invisible Man, the character's first name was Jane, but this was changed to Diane — or "Dee", as Brady himself usually refers to her — for the series.

Production
In the unaired pilot, which bears the on-screen episode title "The Invisible Man" (but is often wrongly referred to as "Secret Experiment"), Canadian actor Robert Beatty provided the voice of Peter Brady. After Ralph Smart, the creator, saw the pilot, he realised that he could not use it. The bandaged hero could be seen bumping into doors and scenery, the strings which animated moving objects could be seen in a number of scenes. Although this Invisible Man was never transmitted, plot elements and footage from it were reused in the episodes "Secret Experiment", "Picnic with Death" and "Bank Raid". The Invisible Man pilot is included in its entirety on the Network DVD release of the series. Note: Series originally started filming in 1957.

A second pilot episode titled "Secret Experiment" was made, and was used as the opening instalment of the series. This featured Dr. Peter Brady (who is only ever seen obliquely), who is unwittingly subjected to radiation and turns invisible. While Brady searches for a cure to restore himself to normal, he also acts as an agent for the British Intelligence services. The original ITC press book states that "Secret Experiment", the second episode "The Locked Room", the fourth episode "Crisis in the Desert" and the fifth episode "Picnic with Death" should be shown first by any TV company; however, this directive was ignored by UK and US broadcasters leading to episodes in which Brady's invisibility is known about by the public, such as "Behind the Mask", being screened before its reveal in the episode "Picnic with Death". In these earlier episodes, the public does not know that Brady is invisible, and he wears bandages and sunglasses (as well as gloves) when he appears in public, but the episode "Behind the Mask" has a foreign industrialist with influence who tricks Brady into making him invisible too in an attempt to assassinate his country's new ruler. Subsequently, in "Picnic with Death", a motoring accident fully exposes Brady's invisibility, to the point that he is besieged by the Press. The same bandages Brady uses when out in public help fugitive convict Joe Green (played by Dermot Walsh) in the episode "Jailbreak" to escape the police when they thought he was Brady.

As a publicity gimmick, the actor playing the Invisible Man himself was never credited, either on-screen or in TVTimes, but Johnny Scripps played Brady without the bandages, i.e. apparently headless but otherwise dressed. Being a little person, he was able to see through the buttonholes in Brady's coat. Tim Turner provided Brady's voice, also without on-screen credit, using a transatlantic accent in order to help ITC sell the series to the United States.

The various 'actors' playing Brady's body remain unknown to this day, apart from Tim Turner whose identity was revealed in 1965 (the series was still being repeated regularly up until 1966). In later episodes, Tim Turner both played and voiced Brady — as press cast list handouts from 1959 clearly show. A number of different 'actors' portrayed Brady throughout the earlier episodes, particularly noticeable in the episode "Play to Kill" where a slim Brady is seen in studio scenes but changes into a stocky version on location. Although according to Lisa Daniely: "I can't remember his name, and he wasn't really a very good actor. And they used somebody else's voice; that was the final insult — poor man. He was quite a nice looking bloke, but not a very dynamic personality."

Tim Turner himself appeared visibly in the "Man in Disguise" episode, though on this occasion he played Nick, a foreign-accented villain who impersonates Brady. Among the writers recruited for the show were Ian Stuart Black, Michael Pertwee and Brian Clemens under the pseudonym Tony O'Grady. Puppeteer Jack Whitehead, who had earlier worked on Muffin the Mule, was called in to provide the brilliant special effects of the show – such as cigarettes smoking while hanging in the air and wine being drunk by an invisible drinker (The pilot episode credits "Trick Photography" by Victor Margutti).

Stuntmen risked their lives hiding in the bottom of cars, driving the vehicle while looking from a slightly open door, or in the steering of a motorbike from a sidecar, which caused members of the public to try and stop what they thought was a runaway vehicle; they didn't realise there was actually a stuntman concealed in the sidecar, steering the motorbike with duplicate controls.

On another occasion, a motorist was surprised to see a car without a driver pull up at traffic lights alongside him. A man then rushed across to the apparently empty car, pulled open the door, and then recoiled from an invisible blow. The motorist didn't know that there was a film unit present, and the man thrown back from the driverless car was actually an actor. Fortunately, the motorist was felt not to have spoilt the take, but rather had helped it — his look of astonishment at what he had witnessed was so well displayed that he was kept in the finished scene.

In the second series, the camera often took on Brady's point of view, i.e. showing whoever and/or whatever the character himself was seeing at the time, which meant that the need for special effects could be cut down.

It has since come to light that two other actors played the voice of Peter Brady after Robert Beatty and before Tim Turner. Because Beatty's Canadian accent in The Invisible Man pilot was considered too harsh, "Secret Experiment" featured the softer accent of fellow Canadian actor Lee Patterson. Unfortunately, when the series was commissioned and went into production, Patterson was found to be committed workwise and so his place was taken by another Canadian actor, Paul Carpenter, a former band singer and B-feature leading man.

The first series was script edited by Victor Wolfson, for the second series Ian Stuart Black took over, having written scripts for the first series. The music for the pilot was composed by Sydney John Kay, and he is credited as the musical director for series one. Assistant directors on series one were Jack Drury (2 episodes), Peter Crowhurst (2 episodes) and David Tomblin, who also worked on all series two episodes and the pilot. Casting director Harry Fine and sound supervisor Fred Turtle also worked on both series

Guest stars included Peter Sallis, Leslie Phillips, Irene Handl, Honor Blackman, Patrick Troughton, Dennis Price, Dermot Walsh, Willoughby Goddard and Ian Hendry.

Episode list
Airdates given here are for ATV London. Other ITV regions varied airdates and transmission order.

Note: The actors who provided the Voice of Peter Brady are listed only once until they change.

Pilot Episode

Series One

Series Two

First series episodes are copyright Incorporated Television Programme Co. Ltd, second series episodes are copyright Official Films Inc.

Apart from ATV London, other UK Networks – such as ABC Weekend Television – screened the series as one 26-episode run between 13 June 1959 and 19 December 1959, Tyne-Tees Television screened the series from its opening night on 15 January 1959.

Home media
MPI Home Video has released the entire series on DVD in North America. The discs are in NTSC format and carry no region encoding. They are available in two double-disc sets, or as a complete, four-disc set.

Network released the entire series in the UK as a four-disc DVD set using new prints made from the original negatives. The discs are in PAL format and are encoded for Region 2.

Label: Network
Release Date: 2008
Catalogue N°: 7952963
Availability: Out now

Special Features
 Brand new commentaries available on Secret Experiment, Picnic With Death featuring Lisa Daniely, Deborah Watling, and Shadow Bomb featuring Brian Clemens and Ray Austin
 The unscreened and abandoned pilot version
 Mute Italian Opening/closing titles
 Image Gallery
 ATV Star Book PDFs (DVD-Rom only. PC/Mac)

Sources
 Roger Fulton, The Encyclopedia of TV Science Fiction, Boxtree, Ltd., 1997 (Revised edition), pp. 199–204.
 Andrew Pixley, Timescreen magazine number 13/Spring 1989, pages 15 – 23.

Other media
 In Alan Moore's The League of Extraordinary Gentlemen: Black Dossier, Peter Brady was one of the members of the failed 1950s League in the fictional The League of Extraordinary Gentlemen universe. Brady recreated Hawley Griffin's original notebooks and successfully achieved invisibility, but was not very impressive as a spy due to smoking-related coughing fits, which revealed his invisible presence.

References

External links
 Mondo-Esoterica.net review of Season 1 and the Network DVD release
 The Encyclopedia of Fantastic Film and Television
 
 

1950s British drama television series
1958 British television series debuts
1959 British television series endings
1958 TV series
Black-and-white British television shows
British drama television series
British science fiction television shows
CBS original programming
English-language television shows
Espionage television series
British fantasy television series
ITV television dramas
Television shows based on British novels
Television series by ITC Entertainment
Adaptations of works by H. G. Wells
Fiction about invisibility
British adventure television series
1950s British science fiction television series
Television shows shot at ATV Elstree Studios